Abraham Smith may refer to:

 Abraham Herr Smith (1815–1894), Republican member of the U.S. House of Representatives from Pennsylvania
 Abraham Smith (footballer) (1910–1974), footballer for Portsmouth and Mansfield Town
Abe Smith in African Rally Championship

See also
Abram Smith (disambiguation)